The 1930 AAA Championship Car season consisted of eight races, beginning in Langhorne, Pennsylvania on May 3 and concluding in Syracuse, New York on September 6.  The AAA National Champion and Indianapolis 500 winner was Billy Arnold.

Schedule and results
All races running on Dirt/Brick/Board Oval.

 Scheduled for 200 miles, stopped early due to rain.

Leading National Championship standings

References

See also
 1930 Indianapolis 500

AAA Championship Car season
AAA Championship Car
1930 in American motorsport